The Four Seas Gang, or FSG (四海幫, or Si Hai Bang) is a triad society based in Taiwan. It includes mainland Chinese and their descendants who fled to Taiwan with the KMT. The Four Seas Gang has an estimated membership 10,000 in Taiwan. Its members have extended their influence to cities in the southern region of California. Its American constituents are a branch off of the original Taiwan society. There are also smaller factions that are merely street gangs, warring with other gangs of low notoriety. Four Seas Gang is active in alien smuggling in Southern California. Their territories are mainly Los Angeles and Santa Ana California. They use the color grey for their individual clothing for the gang.

Historical leadership

Boss (official and acting)
1954-1962 — "Big Feng" Feng Chu-yu
1971-1986 — "Wei-Min" Liu Wei-min
1986?-1994? — "King Tsai" Tsai Kuan-lun
1990?-1994? — "Big Bao" Chen Yung-ho
1994?-1997 — "King Chao" Chao Ching-hua
Acting 1997-2000 — "Kuang-Nan" Yang Kuang-nan
2000-2008 — "Old Chia" Chia Jun-nien
2008-2010 — "Kid Chang" Chang Chien-ying
2010-2012 — "Young Kay" Yang Yu-pin
2012-2021 — "De-Yun" Yang Te-yun
2021-present — "Chun-Wei" Chang tsun-wei

Organization
Since the 1950s development, Four Seas Gang organization has 86 branches, members and partner relations up to 50,000 people.

External links
 Organized Crime in California
 Asian Organized Crime - Australian Parliamentary Inquiry
 Repatriated gang chief sentenced to 22 months
 Taiwan's gangs go global
 The Ultimate Arbitrator
 Police in Shanghai arrest Taiwanese criminal gang head Taipei Times Staff Writer (Nov. 9, 2000).
 Chang's son stabbed by a member of the Four Seas gang in an elevator (April 1998).

Chinese gangs
Gangs in California
Gangs in Asia
Organized crime groups in Taiwan
Street gangs
Triad groups
Asian-American gangs